This List of universities and colleges in France includes universities and other higher education institutes that provide both education curricula and related degrees up to doctoral degree and also contribute to research activities. They are the backbone of the tertiary education institutions in France.
They are listed as different categories, depending on their administrative status, size and extents of research activity compared to educational activities.

Aside from the nationally funded public education system that provides recognised degrees to the vast majority of  students in France and that keeps tuition fees low, there exist private institutes.

Public universities in France

French public universities (see List of public universities in France for a detailed list) are as of 2015 in the process of reorganization according to the Law on Higher Education and Research passed in July 2013. This includes some merging of institutions, and the previous high-level organization under Pôle de recherche et d'enseignement supérieur (PRES) has been dissolved for Communities of Universities and Institutions (COMUE).

Public technical universities, institutes of technologies and autonomous scientific higher education institutes

The Établissements publics à caractère scientifique, culturel et professionnel (EPCSP) that are not listed as universities in the list above operate as university-grade institutes.

Within a public university 

 Paris-Saclay University (Paris region)
 CentraleSupélec
 École normale supérieure de Paris-Saclay
 PSL University (Paris region)
 École normale supérieure de Paris
 École pratique des hautes études
 Collège de France
 Dauphine
 Conservatoire de Paris
 Conservatoire National Supérieur d'Art Dramatique
 École des Beaux-Arts
 Sorbonne University (Paris region)
 University of Technology of Compiègne (alliance)
 University of Paris (Paris region)
 Institut de Physique du Globe de Paris
 Institut d'Études Politiques de Paris (alliance)
 Institut national des langues et civilisations orientales (alliance)
 Gustave Eiffel University (Paris region)
 ESIEE Paris - École Supérieure d'Ingénieurs en Électrotechnique et Électronique
 CY Cergy Paris University (Paris region)
 Institut supérieur de mécanique de Paris (alliance)
 Hautes Écoles Sorbonne Arts et Métiers University (Paris region)
 Arts et Métiers
 Conservatoire National des Arts et Métiers
 University of Lyon (Lyon)
 École centrale de Lyon
 École normale supérieure de Lyon
 Institut National des Sciences Appliquées de Lyon
 University of Toulouse (Toulouse)
 ISAE-SUPAERO
 Institut National des Sciences Appliquées de Toulouse
 Toulouse Institute of Technology
 ENSEEIHT
ENSIACET
ENSAT - École Nationale Supérieure Agronomique de Toulouse
 Polytechnic University of Hauts-de-France (Valenciennes)
 Institut National des Sciences Appliquées des Hauts-de-France
 Grenoble Alpes University (Grenoble)
 Grenoble Institute of Technology

Autonomous scientific higher education institutes 
 École centrale de Lille
 École centrale de Marseille
 École centrale de Nantes 
École nationale supérieure des arts et industries textiles
 École des hautes études en sciences sociales
 IFP School - École Nationale Supérieure du Pétrole et des Moteurs
 Institut National des Sciences Appliquées
 Institut National des Sciences Appliquées de Rennes
 Institut National des Sciences Appliquées de Rouen
 Institut National des Sciences Appliquées de Strasbourg
Université de technologie de Belfort-Montbéliard
 University of Technology of Troyes

Autonomous art schools 
 European Academy of Art in Brittany (EESAB) (France)

Grandes écoles

Private universities in France

Independent institutions 
 Leonardo da Vinci University Center
INSEEC U. 
Hautes Etudes Internationales et Politiques
Centre d'Études Diplomatiques et Stratégiques
Faculté libre de droit, d'économie et de gestion (FACO)

Catholic universities 
Catholic University of Paris
 Catholic University of Toulouse
 Catholic University of the West
 Catholic University of Lyon
 Lille Catholic University
 Catholic University of the Vendée
 Catholic University of Rennes
 Domuni Universitas Toulouse

Protestant universities 
 Free Faculty of Reform Theology of Aix-en-Provence
 Free Faculty of Protestant Theology of Montpellier
 Free Faculty of Protestant Theology of Paris

Others 
 American University of Paris
 Chavagnes Studium
 Touro College France
 American Graduate School in Paris
 Schiller International University
Sigmund Freud University Paris
 European Global School/University
International Institute for Image and Sound of Paris 
 International Institute of Paris
Higher Institute of Law (ISD)
Saint-Jean Institute - Center for Philosophical Studies
 Independent Cooperative University
 Free Faculties of Philosophy and Psychology
 European International University - Paris, France

See also
 List of public universities in France
 Établissement public à caractère scientifique, culturel et professionnel
 Education in France
 List of universities and colleges by country
 Lists of universities and colleges
 G. I American Universities
 Franco-German University (UFA)
 Open access in France

 
Universities
 
Educational institutions in France
France
France